The Legislative Assembly State of Acre (Portuguese: Assembleia Legislativa do Estado do Acre) is the legislative body in the government of the state of Acre in Brazil.

It is composed of 24 state deputies and located in Rio Branco, Acre.

References

State legislatures of Brazil
Politics of Acre (state)
Unicameral legislatures
Acre (state)